Kakuuto is a town in southwestern Central Uganda.

Location
The coordinates of Kakuuto are:0°50'24.0"S, 31°27'36.0" (Latitude:-0.8400; Longitude:31.4600).

Overview
Kakuuto is a small, town in southern Kyotera District. It is the county seat of Kakuuto County. The surrounding area is primarily rural and poor. The population of the area has been greatly adversely affected by the HIV/AIDS epidemic over the past three decades. With the help of charities and NGO's, the town and region is slowly recovering.

Points of interest
The following points of interest lie within the town or close to the town limits:

 The  headquarters of Kakuuto County
 The offices of Kakuuto Town Council 
 Kakuuto General Hospital - A 100-bed hospital, administered by the Uganda Ministry of Health
 Kakuuto Central Market
 Kakuuto Ostrich Farm - A private tourist attraction
 Sango Bay Estates Limited - Uganda's fourth-largest sugar manufacturer. Annual output of 15,000 metric tonnes in 2011.
 Sango Bay Forest Reserve
St. Josephat Junior School - Kakuuto, a private primary school providing education services to children across the East African Region

External links
 About Kakuuto, Rakai District
 USAID Donates Solar Panels to Kakuuto Hospital
 Hospitals in Rakai District

See also
Mutukula
Sango Bay Estates Limited
Rakai District
Central Region, Uganda
St. Josephat Junior School - Kakuuto

References

Rakai District
Populated places in Central Region, Uganda
Cities in the Great Rift Valley